Sean Whitesell (March 11, 1963 – December 28, 2015) was an American film and television actor, writer and producer.

Early life and education
Whitesell was born in Iowa Falls, Iowa, the son of Patricia and John Patrick "Jack" Whitesell. He had five brothers: John II, Christopher, Thomas, Patrick, and James. He graduated from the University of Northern Iowa and then studied acting at the University of California, San Diego, where he received an MFA in acting.

Career 
Whitesell is best known for his portrayal of cannibalistic inmate Donald Groves, the initial cellmate of Miguel Alvarez (Kirk Acevedo), in season one of HBO's Oz, on which he was a regular until his character's execution.

In 2002, Whitesell returned to the show, but not to act; he wrote and produced several episodes in the show's later seasons. Whitesell acted almost exclusively in television, aside from some early minor film roles, such as in Calendar Girl opposite Jason Priestley. He also served as both a writer and a recurring guest actor on Homicide: Life on the Street, in addition to appearing in the television movie that concluded the series in 2000. Although Whitesell did no further acting after the end of Homicide ended, he was a producer for most of the fourth season of House, and also wrote one episode, "Ugly". He also produced and wrote for several other successful series, including The Black Donnellys, Boston Public and Cold Case.

Personal life
Whitesell was married to KTTV weather anchor and morning meteorologist Maria Quiban Whitesell; they had one son, Gus. His father died on December 28, 2015, in Los Angeles from glioblastoma multiforme, aged 52. Services were held at Saint Paul the Apostle Catholic Church in Los Angeles.

Filmography

Film

Television

References

External links
 

1963 births
2015 deaths
American male film actors
American male television actors
American television writers
American male television writers
Television producers from California
University of California, San Diego alumni
People from Iowa Falls, Iowa
Male actors from Iowa
Deaths from brain cancer in the United States
Deaths from glioblastoma
20th-century American male actors
Burials at Westwood Village Memorial Park Cemetery
Screenwriters from Iowa
Screenwriters from California
Whitesell family